Monoxenus bicarinatus is a species of beetle in the family Cerambycidae. It was described by Stephan von Breuning in 1942. It is known from Malawi.

References

bicarinatus
Beetles described in 1942